Kościerza  is a settlement in the administrative district of Gmina Sianów, within Koszalin County, West Pomeranian Voivodeship, in north-western Poland.

Until 1653, the village was part of Duchy of Pomerania. It was part of Brandenburg, then Germany, until the end of World War II. For the post-war history of the region, see History of Pomerania.

References

Villages in Koszalin County